Tim Harris (14 January 1948 – 2007) was a drummer for The Foundations.

History
Tim Harris was the original drummer for the Foundations and played on all of their songs and hits from 1967 until their break up at the end of 1970. In 1977 there was an unsuccessful attempt at a reunion with Harris and another former member of the band, Eric Allandale.

Harris died in 2007.

References

1948 births
2007 deaths
British songwriters
English drummers
British male drummers
The Foundations members
20th-century British male musicians